The Conmhaícne Ceara or Conmaicne Cúile Ceara were an early people of Ireland. Their tuath comprised some or all of the barony of Carra, County Mayo.

Origin
The Conmhaicne or Conmaicne were a people of early Ireland, perhaps related to the Laigin, who dispersed to various parts of Ireland. They settled in Connacht and Longford, giving their name to several Conmaicne territories. Other branches of Conmaicne were located in County Galway, Roscommon, Mayo, and Leitrim.

Old Irish names for Conmaicne Carra appear in Tírechán collections, the Book of Leinster and other old manuscripts-
 "Regiones Maicc Ercae" in Tirechan's Breverium.
 "Maige Maicc Ercae" in Tirechan's Vita Tripartita.
 Cuile Conaire.
 campum Caeri;
 Cera i Connachtaib.
 im Mag Cerae; im maigib maicc Ercae.

In his translation of the Book of Fenagh, O'Donovan identifies the Cinel-Cirend with "Crich-mac-Eric" ("Ulster"), but this is surely wrong. Walsh states the "Conmaicne of Crich Meic Eircce is explained by Cenel Meic Eircce which is equated with the Men of Cera, they gave their name to the barony of Carra".

Territory

The Irish name for the barony of Carra, Ceara, reflects the ancient population group named Conmaicne Carra. The territory was bounded by lakes, and native Irish forests in places. To the south was the Conmaicne Cuile Tolad, now the barony of Kilmaine. To the north is the barony of Tirawley. Eoin MacNeill made interesting comments on the Conmaicne Carra territory-

"i. e. Fir Cherai, their land was wide, i. e. the territory of Cera, until the sons of Brion took it from them as eric for Brion, who fell by Fiachra in the battle of Damchluain.' Our texts refer evidently to a more limited district, which must be located in the northern part of the barony of Carra, bordering on the barony of Tirawley."

A place called Corcu Temne or "Temenrige" is mentioned in Trichans's Brevium as "i Ceri contra solis occasum" which MacNeill translated as "in the west of Cere/Carra".

Septs
O'Culachain (O'Colahan), O'Gormog, Murrays, Ó Móráin, O'Learghusa and O'Tierney families were septs of Conmaicne Carra. The Ó Móráin and O'Tierney surnames appear in other Conmaicne territories.

Patrician churches
In the original Vita tripartita Sancti Patricii, Tírechán said Saint Patrick travelled here from Conmaicne Cuile Tolad, establishing a church at a place named Cuille Corr (Old Irish).

Annals
The "men of Carra" are mentioned in the Annals of the Four Masters.

See also
 Conmhaicne
 Conmaicne Cuile

Notes and References

Notes

Citations

Primary sources

 
 
 

 

History of County Mayo
Historical ethnic groups of Europe
Ethnic groups in Ireland
Gaelic-Irish nations and dynasties
Conmaicne Cúile Ceara